The Dockendorff Group is a geologic group in Maine. It preserves fossils dating back to the Devonian period.

See also

 List of fossiliferous stratigraphic units in Maine
 Paleontology in Maine

References
 

Geologic groups of Maine